The 1931 International Cross Country Championships was held in
Dublin, Ireland, at the Baldoyle Racecourse on 28 March 1931.
For the first time, an unofficial women's championship was held a week earlier
in Douai, France on 22 March 1931. A report on the event was given
in the Glasgow Herald for the men's and the women's event.

Complete results for men, and for women (unofficial), medallists, 
 and the results of British athletes were published.

Medallists

Individual Race Results

Men's (9 mi / 14.5 km)

Women's (1.9 mi / 3.0 km, unofficial)

Team Results

Men's

Women's (unofficial)

Participation

Men's
An unofficial count yields the participation of 54 male athletes from 6 countries.

 (9)
 (9)
 (9)
 (9)
 (9)
 (9)

Women's
An unofficial count yields the participation of 16 female athletes from 3 countries.

 (4)
 (6)
 (6)

See also
 1931 in athletics (track and field)

References

International Cross Country Championships
International Cross Country Championships
Cross
International Cross Country Championships
International Cross Country Championships
Cross country running in Ireland
Cross
Cross country running in France
Athletics in Dublin (city)
1930s in Dublin (city)